Everything's Eventual is a 2002 collection of 11 short stories and 3 novellas by American writer Stephen King.

Stories

"The Little Sisters of Eluria" is part of The Dark Tower series.

Story order
In the introduction to the book, King describes the unusual method he used to sort the stories:

Audio versions

The unabridged digital audiobook edition includes all fourteen stories, but the physical book-on-cd versions of the stories are spread out over several products. "L.T.'s Theory of Pets" is the only story not included in any of the book-on-cd collections, but rather as a standalone product.

Everything's Eventual: Five Dark Tales contains these stories:

 "Everything's Eventual" – read by Justin Long
 "Autopsy Room Four" – read by Oliver Platt
 "The Little Sisters of Eluria" – read by Boyd Gaines
 "Luckey Quarter" – read by Judith Ivey
 "The Road Virus Heads North" – read by Jay O. Sanders

The Man in the Black Suit: 4 Dark Tales contains these stories:

 "The Man in the Black Suit"
 "All That You Love Will Be Carried Away"
 "The Death of Jack Hamilton"
 "That Feeling, You Can Only Say What It Is in French"

Everything's Eventual: Volume 2 is a retitled edition of The Man in the Black Suit: 4 Dark Tales, along with the addition of "Riding the Bullet". It contains these stories:

 "The Man in the Black Suit"
 "All That You Love Will Be Carried Away"
 "The Death of Jack Hamilton"
 "That Feeling, You Can Only Say What It Is in French"
 "Riding the Bullet"

Blood and Smoke contains these stories:

 "1408"
 "In the Deathroom"
 "Lunch at the Gotham Cafe"

"L. T.'s Theory of Pets" and "Riding the Bullet" are available as individual single-story productions.

Film adaptations
Of the stories King wrote for this collection, two became films and another is in the works. The novella Riding the Bullet became a
direct-to-video film by the same name, released in 2004 and directed by Mick Garris, who made many films and TV miniseries of King's works, and the film 1408 (2007) appeared in theaters, starring John Cusack. "The Death of Jack Hamilton" was adapted for the screen for the first time as part of King's "Dollar Baby" deal, and an official teaser trailer for the film was released on September 1, 2012, with an expected release date in 2013.

See also

Stephen King short fiction bibliography

References

2002 short story collections
American short story collections
Charles Scribner's Sons books
Short story collections by Stephen King